War and Pain is the debut studio album from Canadian heavy metal band Voivod, released on August 10, 1984 through Metal Blade Records. According to a 1986 TV interview with the band, it sold over 40,000 copies within 2 years of its release.

War and Pain was reissued several times on the CD format (sometimes on different labels in other countries): in 1990 on Enigma; remastered by Metal Blade and reissued in 1994; it was also released in Roadrunner's Pricekillers series (also 1990); and again by Metal Blade in 2004 as a remastered 3-CD boxset (see the 20th Anniversary Edition section for the bonus material).

A music video was made for the title song "Voivod" and was directed by Dédé Fortin.

Track listing 
All lyrics by Denis "Snake" Bélanger and all music by Denis "Piggy" D'Amour, Jean-Yves "Blacky" Thériault and Michel "Away" Langevin, except where indicated.

"Condemned to the Gallows" was originally recorded for the compilation album Metal Massacre V. Aside from one cassette pressing, "Condemned to the Gallows" was the only track that never appeared on the original LP or CD, nor has it been re-recorded for any future Voivod releases.

20th Anniversary Edition

Disc two: Morgoth Invasion (Live demo, December 1984)

Bonus CD 
In addition to videos, text, and images, the Bonus CD also contains a 46.5 MB mp3 file consisting of the first 7 tracks from a live demo recorded in January 1984, known as "To The Death."

Personnel 
Voivod
Denis "Snake" Bélanger – vocals
Denis "Piggy" D'Amour – guitar
Jean-Yves "Blacky" Thériault – bass
Michel "Away" Langevin – drums, artwork

Production
Guy Pedneault - engineer
Brian Slagel - executive producer

References

1984 debut albums
Voivod (band) albums
Metal Blade Records albums
Roadrunner Records albums